Desvergers, real name Armand-Sacré Chapeau, (1794  – 3rd arrondissement of Paris 26 June 1851 ) was a 19th-century French playwright

Biography 
Little is known about Desvergers's life except the few lines that were dedicated to him by the media, in particular on the occasion of his death, as in Le Nouvelliste 1 July 1851:

It is also known that he married Hélène-Elisa Rachel, 12 December 1822 in the 10th and had at least one son, Étienne-Armand-Albert, born 27 March 1827,

Works 
He wrote over a hundred vaudevilles, alone or in collaboration, between 1824 and 1848. 

 1824 (3 August): L'Anneau de Gygès, comédie-vaudeville in 1 act with Arago at the Théâtre du Vaudeville
 1826 (9 March): Lia, ou une Nuit d'absence, drama-vaudeville in 2 acts with Arago at the Théâtre du Vaudeville, au bénéfice des incendiés de Salins  
 1827 (16 June): L'Avocat, melodrama in 3 acts and extravaganza with Arago at the Théâtre de l'Ambigu-Comique
 1827 (27 July): Le Départ, séjour et retour, roman-vaudeville in 3 periods with Charles Varin and Arago at the Théâtre des Nouveautés
 1828 (18 March): Yelva, ou l'Orpheline russe vaudeville in 2 parts with Scribe and Ferdinand de Villeneuve at the Théâtre de Madame
 1828 (16 July): La Matinée aux contre-temps comédie-vaudeville in 1 act, with Duvert and Victor at the Théâtre des Nouveautés
 1830 (3 March): Arwed, ou les Représailles, épisode de la guerre d'Amérique, drama in 2 acts mingled with couplets with Varin and Arago at the Théâtre du Vaudeville
 1831: Les jeunes bonnes et les vieux garçons, comédie-vaudeville with Varin; Théâtre Palais-Royal, 15 October. The play was translated into the Russian language by Pyotr Karatygin and was part of the repertoire of the Russian imperial theatres
 1833 (15 February): Une Passion vaudeville in 1 act, with Varin and **  at the Théâtre du Vaudeville
 1833 (16 February): Une Répétition générale vaudeville in 1 act, with Scribe and Varin at the Théâtre du Gymnase
 1833 : Les femmes d’emprunt, vaudeville in 1 act, with Varin. Le vaudeville a été traduit en russe by Piotr Karatyguine and was part of the repertoire in the Russian imperial theaters; en 2001 en Russie a été créé le film " Le Menteur Paleface " sur la base de ce vaudeville, the director was Vitaly Moskalenko
 1834 (2 April): Théophile, ou Ma vocation comédie-vaudeville in 1 act, with Varin et Arago at the Théâtre du Vaudeville
 1834 (25 January): Les Malheurs d'un joli garçon vaudeville in 1 act, with Varin and Arago at the Théâtre du Vaudeville. The vaudeville was translated into the Russian language by Pavel Feodorov and P.I. Valverch
 1834 (18 November): Georgette comédie-vaudeville in 1 act, with Varin and Laurencin at the Théâtre du Vaudeville
 1834 : Ma femme et mon parapluie, comédie-vaudeville in 1 act, with Laurencin and Varin. The vaudeville was translated into the Russian language by Piotr Karatyguine and was part of the repertoire of the imperial Russian theaters.
 1835 (10 February): Les pages de Bassompierre, with Varin and Arago at the Théâtre du Vaudeville. The play was translated into the Russian language by Dmitry Lensky and was part of the repertoire of the Russian Imperial theaters
 1836 (2 January): Le Oui fatal, ou le Célibataire sans le savoir comédie-vaudeville in 1 act, with Varin at the Théâtre de la Porte-Saint-Martin
 1836 (15 July): Le Chapître des informations, comedy in 1 act, with Varin at the Théâtre du Vaudeville
 1836 : Un bal du grand monde, vaudeville, with Charles Varin; Théâtre du Vaudeville (7 June). The vaudeville was translated into the Russian language by Pavel Feodorov
 1836 (20 June): Balthasar, ou le Retour d'Afrique vaudeville in 1 act, with Varin and Derville at the Théâtre des Variétés
 1836 (20 July): Casanova au Fort Saint-André vaudeville in 3 acts, with Varin and Arago at the Théâtre du Vaudeville 
 1836 (22 October): Le Tour de France, ou un An de travail vaudeville in 1 act, with Varin at the Théâtre de la Porte Saint-Antoine
 1836 (30 October): Feu mon frère comédie-vaudeville in 1 act, at the Théâtre de l'Ambigu-Comique
 1837 (21 September): Le Tourlourou vaudeville in 5 acts, with Varin and Paul de Kock at the Théâtre du Vaudeville
 1837 (2 December): Mal noté dans le quartier tableau populaire in 1 act, with Hippolyte Leroux at the Théâtre du Vaudeville
 1838 (30 July): La Cachuca, ou Trois cœurs tout neufs vaudeville with Martin and Morel at the Théâtre du Gymnase
 1838 (9 September): L'Ouverture de la chasse tableau-vaudeville in 1 act with Gustave Albitte at the Théâtre des Variétés
 1839 (28 January): La Gitana vaudeville in 3 acts with Laurencin at the Théâtre du Gymnase
 1839 (15 July): Les brodequins de Lise vaudeville in 1 act with Laurencin and Gustave Vaëz at the Théâtre du Gymnase. The vaudeville was translated into the Russian language by Piotr Karatyguine and was part of the repertoire of the Russian imperial theaters
 1845 (12 February): L'Article 170, ou un Mariage à l'étranger comedy in 2 acts with Louis Dugard at the Théâtre royal de l'Odéon
 1847 (22 May): Barbe-Bleue, ou la Fée Perruchette, féérie-vaudeville in 3 acts and 15 tableaux with Aimé Bourdon, music by Joseph-Simon Lautz  at the Gymnase des Jeunes-Élèves.

References

External links 
 Desvergers sur data.bnf.fr

19th-century French dramatists and playwrights
Place of birth missing
1794 births
Place of death missing
1851 deaths